Marry Him If You Dare (lit. Mirae's Choice or Future's Choice) is a 2013 South Korean television series starring Yoon Eun-hye, Lee Dong-gun, Jung Yong-hwa, Han Chae-ah, and Choi Myung-gil. It aired on KBS2 from October 14 to December 3, 2013 on Mondays and Tuesdays at 22:00 for 16 episodes.

Plot
Set in the world of television broadcasting, Na Mi-rae travels back in time to prevent her 32-year-old self from marrying news anchor Kim Shin, thus sending her past self down a different path and enabling her to pursue the things she really wanted in life.

Cast

Main
Yoon Eun-hye as Na Mi-rae 
A bright and lovable 32-year-old who spends her days chanting to herself, “I'm okay!” and barely scrapes by in her job as a call center agent. But one day, her future self appears in front of her and changes her life. She begins to pursue her dream of becoming a television writer.

Lee Dong-gun as Kim Shin
The network's lead news anchor. He can be prickly, but is also highly principled and upright.

Jung Yong-hwa as Park Se-joo
The CEO's grandson who is set to inherit the network. He went to film school in America, and is masquerading as a lowly cameraman (or VJ). He dreams of building a media conglomerate.

Han Chae-ah as Seo Yoo-kyung
A reporter on the morning show. Outwardly cute, she is smart and cunning.

Choi Myung-gil as Na Mi-rae's future self
 She came from future to change her present life.

Supporting
Oh Jung-se as Noh Joo-hyun
Lee Mi-do as Bae Hyun-ah
Lee Jung-hyuk as Seong-hoon	
Ba Ram as Chang Gong 
Ahn Se-ha as Lee Jae-soo
Go Doo-shim as Lee Mi-ran
Kim Ji-ho  as black man
Jang Eun-ah as announcer
Shin Bo-ra as entertainer (cameo)

Original Soundtrack

Ratings

Awards and nominations

References

External links
  
 
 
 

2013 South Korean television series debuts
2013 South Korean television series endings
Korean Broadcasting System television dramas
Korean-language television shows
South Korean time travel television series
South Korean romantic comedy television series
South Korean fantasy television series